Bagasara is a municipality in Bagasara Taluka of Amreli district, Gujarat, India. The town is situated on the northern bank of the Satalli river. nearest airport div airport (54 km).

History
Bagasara was conquered in about 1525 by Vala Mancha Bhaiya of Devgam Devli. Vala Mancha was succeeded by his son Bhaiya, from whom the Bagasara Kathis are called Bhaiyani. 
There are many dawoodi bohras in the city. During British period, the town belonged to the Vala Kathis and is the seat of Kathiawar Agency thana.

Demographics
 India census, Bagasara had a population of 31,789. Males constitute 52% of the population and females 48%. Bagasara has an average literacy rate of 70%, higher than the national average of 59.5%; with 56% of the males and 44% of females literate. 12% of the population is under 6 years of age.

Economy
Bagasara is known for its imitation gold plated jewellery and Ari Bharat embroidery clothes. Square sheets chophaal, and women's scarves sadla, of native manufacture, are made here. There is a market for Gir timber.

Schools
There is a school founded by independence activist Lalchand Vora in 1931. In 1986, a very famous school started with the name Smt K.G.Dhanak Vidyamandir, near station road bagasara
In 2016 New Science Private School named Sawstik public school started.
There is popular school named Rashtriya Shayar Shree Zaverchand Meghani High School. It has Science, Commerce and Arts faculty.

Famous People
 Magician K.Lal is from a small village name Mavjhinjhva. 
 Rashtriya Shayar Swa. Shri Zaverchand Meghani.
 Kutubbhai Azad is a famous poet of Bagasara.
 Snehi Parmar is also a famous poet of Bagasara.
 H.R. Sekhwa is well known for his contribution in education field.
 Vivek Teraiya is known for ShouldCreative.com and his contribution in online educational content.
 Uzair Younus, famous Pakistani American economist

Colleges
Bagasara also has a college named Dhanak College.It is a commerce college.

Places of interest
Main Masjids
Jumma Masjid
Nagina Masjid
Arabvad Masjid
Alisha Peer Dargah
Hazarat Haji Hamidullahsha Peer urge Dangiya Peer bapu
Hazarat Ingarsha Peer.

Bagasra main Temples
 Shree Swaminarayan Temple, Kukavav Road, Bagasara
 Shree Bageshwar Mahadev Mandir Amarpara, Bagasara 
 MOTI HAVELI -Shri madanmohanji ni moti haveli. It is a haveli of Shuddhadvaita pushtimarg founded by jagadguru shri vallabhacharya mahaprabhuji.
Current gadi pati of haveli is 
HH goswami shri 108 shri prabhuji maharajshri of surat.
 Vraj Kashi Dhaam, Raghunath Mahadev Temple C/o Daughters and Sons of Late Shri. Vrajlal Ramji. Anadkat (Notable Grain-Merchant). Temple constructed with gathered funds of six daughters and three brothers. 
 Ratneshwer mahadev mandir
 Bhutnath Mahadev Temple
 Munjiyasar Dam
 Jay gopal pushtimargiya Haveli.
 Hanumanji Temple (Charan Pipali)
 Atalji garden.
 Pujay Shree Aapagiga ni jagya
 Gayatri temple
 Mantreshvar Mahadev Mandir (near Munjiyasar Dam)
 Khodiyar Mataji Temple (Munjiyasar Dam)
 Shree Siyaram Gausala (Gokulpara, near riverbank)
 Kailashdham (Rafala)

References

 This article incorporates text from a publication now in the public domain: 

Cities and towns in Amreli district